Trotskyism is the political ideology and branch of Marxism developed by Russian revolutionary Leon Trotsky and some other members of the Left Opposition and Fourth International. Trotsky described himself as an orthodox Marxist, a revolutionary Marxist, and Bolshevik–Leninist, a follower of Marx, Engels, and 3L: Vladimir Lenin, Karl Liebknecht, and Rosa Luxemburg. He supported founding a vanguard party of the proletariat, proletarian internationalism, and a dictatorship of the proletariat (as opposed to the "dictatorship of the bourgeoisie", which Marxists argue defines capitalism) based on working-class self-emancipation and mass democracy. Trotskyists are critical of Stalinism as they oppose Joseph Stalin's theory of socialism in one country in favour of Trotsky's theory of permanent revolution. Trotskyists criticize the bureaucracy and anti-democratic current developed in the Soviet Union under Stalin.

Vladimir Lenin and Trotsky, despite their ideological disputes, were close personally prior to the London congress of social democrats in 1903 and during the First World War. Lenin and Trotsky were close ideologically and personally during the Russian Revolution and its aftermath, and Trotskyists and some others call Trotsky its "co-leader". Trotsky was the Red Army's paramount leader in the Revolutionary period's direct aftermath. Trotsky initially opposed some aspects of Leninism but eventually concluded that unity between the Mensheviks and Bolsheviks was impossible and joined the Bolsheviks. Trotsky played a leading role with Lenin in the October Revolution. Assessing Trotsky, Lenin wrote: "Trotsky long ago said that unification is impossible. Trotsky understood this and from that time on, there has been no better Bolshevik."

In 1927, Trotsky was purged from the Communist Party and Soviet politics. In October, by order of Stalin, Trotsky was removed from power and, in November, expelled from the All-Union Communist Party (Bolsheviks). He was exiled to Alma-Ata (now Almaty) in January 1928 and then expelled from the Soviet Union in February 1929. As the head of the Fourth International, Trotsky continued in exile to oppose what he termed the degenerated workers' state in the Soviet Union. On 20 August 1940, Trotsky was attacked in Mexico City by Ramón Mercader, a Spanish-born NKVD agent, and died the next day in a hospital. His murder is considered a political assassination. Almost all Trotskyists within the All-Union Communist Party (Bolsheviks) were executed in the Great Purges of 1937–1938, effectively removing all of Trotsky's internal influence in the Soviet Union. Nikita Khrushchev had come to power as head of the Communist Party in Ukraine, signing lists of other Trotskyists to be executed. Trotsky and the party of Trotskyists were still recognized as enemies of the USSR during Khrushchev's rule of the Soviet Union from 1956.

Trotsky's Fourth International was established in the French Third Republic in 1938 when Trotskyists argued that the Comintern or Third International had become irretrievably "lost to Stalinism" and thus incapable of leading the international working class to political power. In contemporary English language usage, an advocate of Trotsky's ideas is often called a "Trotskyist". A Trotskyist may be called a "Trotskyite" or "Trot", especially by a critic of Trotskyism.

Definition 

According to Trotsky, his program could be distinguished from other Marxist theories by five key elements:
 Support for the strategy of permanent revolution in opposition to the two-stage theory of his opponents.
 Criticism of the post-1924 leadership of the Soviet Union and analysis of its features, after 1933, also support for political revolution in the Soviet Union and what Trotskyists term the degenerated workers' states.
 Support for social revolution in the advanced capitalist countries through working-class mass action.
 Support for proletarian internationalism.
 Use of a transitional programme of demands that bridge between daily struggles of the working class and the maximal ideas of the socialist transformation of society.

On the political spectrum of Marxism, Trotskyists are usually considered to be on the left. In the 1920s, they called themselves the Left Opposition, although today's left communism is distinct and usually non-Bolshevik. The terminological disagreement can be confusing because different versions of a left-right political spectrum are used. Anti-revisionists consider themselves the ultimate leftists on a spectrum from communism on the left to imperialist capitalism on the right. However, given that Stalinism is often labelled rightist within the communist spectrum and left communism leftist, anti-revisionists' idea of the left is very different from that of left communism. Despite being Bolshevik-Leninist comrades during the Russian Revolution and Russian Civil War, Trotsky and Stalin became enemies in the 1920s and, after that, opposed the legitimacy of each other's forms of Leninism. Trotsky was highly critical of the Stalinist USSR for suppressing democracy and the lack of adequate economic planning.

Theory 

In 1905, Trotsky formulated his theory of permanent revolution, which later became a defining characteristic of Trotskyism. Until 1905, some revolutionaries claimed that Marx's theory of history posited that only a revolution in a European capitalist society would lead to a socialist one. According to this position, a socialist revolution could not occur in a backward, feudal country such as early 20th-century Russia when it had such a small and almost powerless capitalist class.

The theory of permanent revolution addressed how such feudal regimes were to be overthrown and how socialism could be established given the lack of economic prerequisites. Trotsky argued that only the working class could overthrow feudalism and win the peasantry's support in Russia. Furthermore, he argued that the Russian working class would not stop there. They would win their revolution against the weak capitalist class, establish a workers' state in Russia and appeal to the working class in the advanced capitalist countries worldwide. As a result, the global working class would come to Russia's aid, and socialism could develop worldwide.

Capitalist or bourgeois-democratic revolution 
Revolutions in Britain in the 17th century and in France in 1789 abolished feudalism and established the essential requisites for the development of capitalism. Trotsky argued that these revolutions would not be repeated in Russia.

In Results and Prospects, written in 1906, Trotsky outlines his theory in detail, arguing: "History does not repeat itself. However much one may compare the Russian Revolution with the Great French Revolution, the former can never be transformed into a repetition of the latter." In the French Revolution of 1789, France experienced what Marxists called a "bourgeois-democratic revolution"—a regime was established wherein the bourgeoisie overthrew the existing French feudalistic system. The bourgeoisie then moved towards establishing a regime of democratic parliamentary institutions. However, while democratic rights were extended to the bourgeoisie, they were not generally extended to a universal franchise. The freedom for workers to organize unions or to strike was not achieved without considerable struggle.

Passivity of the bourgeoisie 
Trotsky argues that countries like Russia had no "enlightened, active" revolutionary bourgeoisie which could play the same role, and the working class constituted a tiny minority. By the time of the European revolutions of 1848, "the bourgeoisie was already unable to play a comparable role. It did not want and was not able to undertake the revolutionary liquidation of the social system that stood in its path to power."

The theory of permanent revolution considers that in many countries that are thought under Trotskyism to have not yet completed a bourgeois-democratic revolution, the capitalist class opposes the creation of any revolutionary situation. They fear stirring the working class into fighting for its revolutionary aspirations against their exploitation by capitalism. In Russia, the working class, although a small minority in a predominantly peasant-based society, was organised in vast factories owned by the capitalist class and into large working-class districts. During the Russian Revolution of 1905, the capitalist class found it necessary to ally with reactionary elements such as the essentially feudal landlords and, ultimately, the existing Czarist Russian state forces. This was to protect their ownership of their property—factories, banks, etc.—from expropriation by the revolutionary working class.

Therefore, according to the theory of permanent revolution, the capitalist classes of economically backward countries are weak and incapable of carrying through revolutionary change. As a result, they are linked to and rely on the feudal landowners in many ways. Thus Trotsky argues that because a majority of the branches of industry in Russia originated under the direct influence of government measures—sometimes with the help of government subsidies—the capitalist class was again tied to the ruling elite. The capitalist class were subservient to European capital.

The incapability of the peasantry 
The theory of permanent revolution further considers that the peasantry as a whole cannot take on the task of carrying through the revolution because it is dispersed in small holdings throughout the country and forms a heterogeneous grouping, including the rich peasants who employ rural workers and aspire to landlordism as well as the poor peasants who aspire to own more land. Trotsky argues: "All historical experience [...] shows that the peasantry are absolutely incapable of taking up an independent political role".

The key role of the proletariat 
Trotskyists differ on the extent to which this is true today. However, even the most orthodox tend to recognise in the late twentieth century a new development in the revolts of the rural poor: the self-organising struggles of the landless, along with many other struggles that in some ways reflect the militant united, organised struggles of the working class, which to various degrees do not bear the marks of class divisions typical of the heroic peasant struggles of previous epochs. However, orthodox Trotskyists today still argue that the town- and city-based working-class struggle is central to the task of a successful socialist revolution linked to these struggles of the rural poor. They argue that the working class learns of the necessity to conduct a collective struggle, for instance, in trade unions, arising from its social conditions in the factories and workplaces; and that the collective consciousness it achieves as a result is an essential ingredient of the socialist reconstruction of society.

Trotsky himself argued that only the proletariat or working class were capable of achieving the tasks of that bourgeois revolution. In 1905, the working class in Russia, a generation brought together in vast factories from the relative isolation of peasant life, saw the result of its labour as a vast collective effort, also seeing the only means of struggling against its oppression in terms of a collective effort, forming workers councils (soviets) in the course of the revolution of that year. In 1906, Trotsky argued: 

For instance, the Putilov Factory numbered 12,000 workers in 1900 and, according to Trotsky, 36,000 in July 1917.

Although only a tiny minority in Russian society, the proletariat would lead a revolution to emancipate the peasantry and thus "secure the support of the peasantry" as part of that revolution, on whose support it will rely. However, to improve their conditions, the working class must create a revolution of their own, which would accomplish the bourgeois revolution and establish a workers' state.

International revolution 
According to classical Marxism, a revolution in peasant-based countries such as Russia ultimately prepares the ground for capitalism's development since the liberated peasants become small owners, producers, and traders. This leads to the growth of commodity markets, from which a new capitalist class emerges. Only fully developed capitalist conditions prepare the basis for socialism.

Trotsky agreed that a new socialist state and economy in a country like Russia would not be able to hold out against the pressures of a hostile capitalist world and the internal pressures of its backward economy. Trotsky argued that the revolution must quickly spread to capitalist countries, bringing about a socialist revolution that must spread worldwide. In this way, the revolution is "permanent", moving out of necessity first, from the bourgeois revolution to the workers’ revolution and from there uninterruptedly to European and worldwide revolutions.

An internationalist outlook of permanent revolution is found in the works of Karl Marx. The term "permanent revolution" is taken from a remark of Marx in his March 1850 Address: "it is our task", Marx said:

History

Origins 

According to Trotsky, the term "Trotskyism" was coined by Pavel Milyukov (sometimes transliterated as Paul Miliukoff), the ideological leader of the Constitutional Democratic Party (Kadets) in Russia. Milyukov waged a bitter war against Trotskyism "as early as 1905".

Trotsky was elected chairman of the St. Petersburg Soviet during the Russian Revolution of 1905. He pursued a policy of proletarian revolution at a time when other socialist trends advocated a transition to a "bourgeois" (capitalist) regime to replace the essentially feudal Romanov state. This year, Trotsky developed the theory of permanent revolution, as it later became known (see below). In 1905, Trotsky quotes from a postscript to a book by Milyukov, The Elections to the Second State Duma, published no later than May 1907: 

Milyukov suggests that the mood of the "democratic public" was in support of Trotsky's policy of the overthrow of the Romanov regime alongside a workers' revolution to overthrow the capitalist owners of industry, support for strike action and the establishment of democratically elected workers' councils or "soviets".

Trotskyism and the 1917 Russian Revolution 
During his leadership of the Russian revolution of 1905, Trotsky argued that once it became clear that the Tsar's army would not come out in support of the workers, it was necessary to retreat before the armed might of the state in as good an order as possible. In 1917, Trotsky was again elected chairman of the Petrograd soviet, but this time soon came to lead the Military Revolutionary Committee, which had the allegiance of the Petrograd garrison and carried through the October 1917 insurrection. Stalin wrote: 

As a result of his role in the Russian Revolution of 1917, the theory of permanent revolution was embraced by the young Soviet state until 1924.

The Russian revolution of 1917 was marked by two revolutions: the relatively spontaneous February 1917 revolution and the 25 October 1917 seizure of power by the Bolsheviks, who had gained the leadership of the Petrograd soviet.

Before the February 1917 Russian revolution, Lenin had formulated a slogan calling for the "democratic dictatorship of the proletariat and the peasantry", but after the February revolution, through his April Theses, Lenin instead called for "all power to the Soviets". Nevertheless, Lenin continued to emphasise (as did Trotsky) the classical Marxist position that the peasantry formed a basis for the development of capitalism, not socialism.

Also, before February 1917, Trotsky had not accepted the importance of a Bolshevik-style organisation. Once the February 1917 Russian revolution had broken out, Trotsky admitted the importance of a Bolshevik organisation and joined the Bolsheviks in July 1917. Although many, like Stalin, saw Trotsky's role in the October 1917 Russian revolution as central, Trotsky wrote that without Lenin and the Bolshevik Party, the October revolution of 1917 would not have taken place.

As a result, since 1917, Trotskyism as a political theory has been fully committed to a Leninist style of democratic centralist party organisation, which Trotskyists argue must not be confused with the party organisation as it later developed under Stalin. Trotsky had previously suggested that Lenin's method of organisation would lead to a dictatorship. However, it is essential to emphasise that after 1917, orthodox Trotskyists argue that the loss of democracy in the Soviet Union was caused by the failure of the revolution to spread internationally and the consequent wars, isolation, and imperialist intervention, not the Bolshevik style of organisation.

Lenin's outlook had always been that the Russian revolution would need to stimulate a Socialist revolution in Western Europe so that this European socialist society would come to the aid of the Russian revolution and enable Russia to advance towards socialism. Lenin stated: 

This outlook matched Trotsky's theory of permanent revolution precisely. Trotsky's permanent revolution had foreseen that the working class would not stop at the bourgeois democratic stage of the revolution but proceed towards a workers' state, as happened in 1917. The Polish Trotskyist Isaac Deutscher maintains that in 1917, Lenin changed his attitude toward Trotsky's theory of Permanent Revolution, and after the October revolution, it was adopted by the Bolsheviks.

Lenin was met with initial disbelief in April 1917. Trotsky argues that:

"Legend of Trotskyism" 

In The Stalin School of Falsification, Trotsky argues that what he calls the "legend of Trotskyism" was formulated by Grigory Zinoviev and Lev Kamenev in collaboration with Stalin in 1924 in response to the criticisms Trotsky raised of Politburo policy. Orlando Figes argues: "The urge to silence Trotsky, and all criticism of the Politburo, was in itself a crucial factor in Stalin's rise to power".

During 1922–1924, Lenin suffered a series of strokes and became increasingly incapacitated. In a document dictated before his death in 1924 while describing Trotsky as "distinguished not only by his exceptional abilities—personally he is, to be sure, the most able man in the present Central Committee" and also maintaining that "his non-Bolshevik past should not be held against him", Lenin criticized him for "showing excessive preoccupation with the purely administrative side of the work" and also requested that Stalin be removed from his position of General Secretary, but his notes remained suppressed until 1956. Zinoviev and Kamenev broke with Stalin in 1925 and joined Trotsky in 1926 in what was known as the United Opposition.

In 1926, Stalin allied with Nikolai Bukharin, who led the campaign against "Trotskyism". In The Stalin School of Falsification, Trotsky quotes Bukharin's 1918 pamphlet, From the Collapse of Czarism to the Fall of the Bourgeoisie, which was re-printed in 1923 by the party publishing house, Proletari. Bukharin explains and embraces Trotsky's theory of permanent revolution in this pamphlet: "The Russian proletariat is confronted more sharply than ever before with the problem of the international revolution ... The grand total of relationships which have arisen in Europe leads to this inevitable conclusion. Thus, the permanent revolution in Russia is passing into the European proletarian revolution". Yet it is common knowledge, Trotsky argues, that three years later in 1926 "Bukharin was the chief and indeed the sole theoretician of the entire campaign against 'Trotskyism', summed up in the struggle against the theory of the permanent revolution."

Trotsky wrote that the Left Opposition grew in influence throughout the 1920s, attempting to reform the Communist Party, but in 1927 Stalin declared "civil war" against them:

The defeat of the European working class led to further isolation in Russia and further suppression of the Opposition. Trotsky argued that the "so-called struggle against 'Trotskyism' grew out of the bureaucratic reaction against the October Revolution [of 1917]". He responded to the one-sided civil war with his Letter to the Bureau of Party History (1927), contrasting what he claimed to be the falsification of history with the official history of just a few years before. He further accused Stalin of derailing the Chinese revolution and causing the massacre of the Chinese workers: 

Trotsky was sent into internal exile, and his supporters were jailed. For instance, Victor Serge first "spent six weeks in a cell" after a visit at midnight, then 85 days in an inner GPU cell, most of it in solitary confinement. He details the jailings of the Left Opposition. However, the Left Opposition worked secretly within the Soviet Union. Trotsky was eventually exiled to Turkey and moved to France, Norway and finally Mexico.

After 1928, the various Communist Parties worldwide expelled Trotskyists from their ranks. Most Trotskyists defend the economic achievements of the planned economy in the Soviet Union during the 1920s and 1930s, despite the "misleadership" of the Soviet bureaucracy and what they claim to be the loss of democracy. Trotskyists claim that in 1928 inner party democracy and soviet democracy, which was at the foundation of Bolshevism, had been destroyed within the various Communist Parties. Anyone who disagreed with the party line was labelled a Trotskyist and even a fascist.

In 1937, Stalin again unleashed what Trotskyists say was a political terror against their Left Opposition and many of the remaining Old Bolsheviks (those who had played vital roles in the October Revolution in 1917) in the face of increased opposition, particularly in the army.

Founding of the Fourth International 

Trotsky founded the International Left Opposition in 1930. It was meant to be an opposition group within the Comintern, but anyone who joined or was suspected of joining the ILO was immediately expelled from the Comintern. The ILO, therefore, concluded that opposing Stalinism from within the communist organizations controlled by Stalin's supporters had become impossible, so new organizations had to be formed. In 1933, the ILO was renamed the International Communist League (ICL), which formed the basis of the Fourth International, founded in Paris in 1938.

Trotsky said that only the Fourth International, based on Lenin's theory of the vanguard party, could lead the world revolution and that it would need to be built in opposition to the capitalists and the Stalinists.

Trotsky argued that the defeat of the German working class and the coming to power of Adolf Hitler in 1933 was due in part to the mistakes of the Third Period policy of the Communist International and that the subsequent failure of the Communist Parties to draw the correct lessons from those defeats showed that they were no longer capable of reform and a new international organisation of the working class must be organised. The transitional demand tactic had to be a key element.

At the time of the founding of the Fourth International in 1938, Trotskyism was a mass political current in Vietnam, Sri Lanka and slightly later Bolivia. There was also a substantial Trotskyist movement in China which included the founding father of the Chinese communist movement, Chen Duxiu, amongst its number. Wherever Stalinists gained power, they prioritised hunting down Trotskyists and treated them as the worst enemies.

The Fourth International suffered repression and disruption through the Second World War. Isolated from each other and faced with political developments quite unlike those anticipated by Trotsky, some Trotskyist organizations decided that the Soviet Union could no longer be called a degenerated workers' state and withdrew from the Fourth International. After 1945, Trotskyism was smashed as a mass movement in Vietnam and marginalised in many other countries.

The International Secretariat of the Fourth International (ISFI) organised an international conference in 1946 and then World Congresses in 1948 and 1951 to assess the expropriation of the capitalists in Eastern Europe and Yugoslavia, the threat of a Third World War and the tasks of revolutionaries. The Eastern European Communist-led governments, which came into being after World War II without a social revolution, were described by a resolution of the 1948 congress as presiding over capitalist economies. By 1951, the Congress had concluded that they had become "deformed workers' states". As the Cold War intensified, the ISFI's 1951 World Congress adopted theses by Michel Pablo that anticipated an international civil war. Pablo's followers considered that the Communist Parties, under pressure from the real workers' movement, could escape Stalin's manipulations and follow a revolutionary orientation.

The 1951 Congress argued that Trotskyists should start to conduct systematic work inside those Communist Parties, followed by the majority of the working class. However, the ISFI's view that the Soviet leadership was counter-revolutionary remained unchanged. The 1951 Congress argued that the Soviet Union took over these countries because of the military and political results of World War II and instituted nationalized property relations only after its attempts at placating capitalism failed to protect those countries from the threat of incursion by the West.

Pablo began expelling many people who disagreed with his thesis and did not want to dissolve their organizations within the Communist Parties. For instance, he expelled most of the French section and replaced its leadership. As a result, the opposition to Pablo eventually rose to the surface, with the Open Letter to Trotskyists of the World, by Socialist Workers Party leader James P. Cannon.

The Fourth International split in 1953 into two public factions. Several sections of the International established the International Committee of the Fourth International (ICFI) as an alternative centre to the International Secretariat, in which they felt a revisionist faction led by Michel Pablo had taken power and recommitted themselves to the Lenin-Trotsky Theory of the Party and Trotsky's theory of Permanent Revolution. From 1960, led by the U.S Socialist Workers Party, many ICFI sections began the reunification process with the IS, but factions split off and continued their commitment to the ICFI. Today, national parties committed to the ICFI call themselves the Socialist Equality Party.

Trotskyist movements

Latin America 
Trotskyism has influenced some recent major social upheavals, particularly in Latin America.
The Bolivian Trotskyist party (POR) became a mass party in the late 1940s and early 1950s and, together with other groups, played a central role during and immediately after the period termed the Bolivian National Revolution.

In Brazil, as an officially recognised platform or faction of the PT until 1992, the Trotskyist Movimento Convergência Socialista (CS), which founded the United Socialist Workers' Party (PSTU) in 1994, saw a number of its members elected to national, state and local legislative bodies during the 1980s. The Socialism and Liberty Party (PSOL) presidential candidate in the 2006 general elections, Heloísa Helena, is a Trotskyist member of the Workers Party of Brazil (PT), a legislative deputy in Alagoas and in 1999 was elected to the Federal Senate. Expelled from the PT in December 2003, she helped found PSOL, in which various Trotskyist groups play a prominent role.

In Argentina, the Workers' Revolutionary Party (Partido Revolucionario de los Trabajadores, PRT) lay in the merger of two leftist organizations in 1965, the Revolutionary and Popular Amerindian Front (FRIP) and Worker's Word . In 1968, the PRT adhered to the Fourth International, based in Paris. That same year, a related organisation was founded in Argentina, the ERP (People's Revolutionary Army), which became South America's strongest rural guerrilla movement during the 1970s. The PRT left the Fourth International in 1973. During the Dirty War, the Argentine military regime suppressed both the PRT and the ERP. ERP commander Roberto Santucho was killed in July 1976. Owing to the ruthless repression, PRT showed no signs of activity after 1977. During the 1980s in Argentina, the Trotskyist party founded in 1982 by Nahuel Moreno, MAS (Movement Toward Socialism), claimed to be the "largest Trotskyist party" in the world before it broke into many different fragments in the late 1980s, including the present-day MST, PTS, Nuevo MAS, IS, PRS, FOS, etc. In 1989, an electoral front with the Communist Party and Christian nationalist groups called  ("United Left") retrieved 3.49% of the vote, representing 580,944 voters. Today, the Workers' Party in Argentina has an electoral base in Salta Province in the far north, particularly in the city of Salta itself; and has become the third political force in the provinces of Tucumán, also in the north; and Santa Cruz, in the south.

Venezuelan president Hugo Chávez declared himself a Trotskyist during the swearing-in of his cabinet two days before his inauguration on 10 January 2007. Venezuelan Trotskyist organizations do not regard Chávez as a Trotskyist, with some describing him as a bourgeois nationalist while others consider him an honest revolutionary leader who made significant mistakes due to him lacking a Marxist analysis.

Asia 

In China, various left opposition groups in the late 1920s sought to engage Trotsky against the Comintern policy of support for the Kuomintang. In 1931, at Trotsky's urging, the various factions united in the Communist League of China, adopting Trotsky's document "The Political Situation in China and the Task of the Bolshevik-Leninist Opposition". Prominent members include Chen Duxiu, Wang Fanxi and Chen Qichang. The League was persecuted by the Nationalist government and by the Chinese Communist Party.

In 1939, Ho Chi Minh, then a Comintern agent in southern China, reported that "everyone united to fight the Japanese except the Trotskyists. These traitors . . . adopted the ‘resolution’: ‘In the war against the Japanese, our position is clear: those who wanted the war and have illusions about the Kuomintang government, those concretely have committed treason. The union between the Communist Party and the Kuomintang is nothing but conscious treason’. And other ignominies of this kind." The Trotskyists were to be "crushed." In 1949, the Revolutionary Communist Party of China (RCP) fled to Hong Kong. Since 1974, the party has been legally active as October Review, its official publication.

In French Indochina during the 1930s, Vietnamese Trotskyism, led by Tạ Thu Thâu, was a significant current, particularly in Saigon, Cochinchina. In 1929, in the French Left Opposition , Ta Thu Thau condemned the Comintern for leading Chinese Communists (in 1927) to "the graveyard" through its support for the Kuomintang. The "'Sun Yat-sen-ist' synthesis of democracy, nationalism and socialism" was "a kind of nationalist mysticism." In Indochina, it could only obscure "the concrete class relationships, and the real, organic liaison between the indigenous bourgeoisie and French imperialism," in the light of which the call for independence is "mechanical and formalistic." "A revolution based on the organisation of the proletarian and peasant masses is the only one capable of liberating the colonies ... The question of independence must be bound up with that of the proletarian socialist revolution."

For a period in the 1930s, Ta Thu Thau's Struggle group, centred around the newspaper La Lutte, was sufficiently strong to induce "Stalinists" (members of the then Indochinese Communist Party) to collaborate with the Trotskyists in support of labour and peasant struggles, and in the presentation of a common Workers Slate for Saigon municipal, and Cochinchina Council, elections. Ta Thu Thau was captured and executed by the Communist-front Viet Minh in September 1945. Many, if not most, of his fellow luttuers were subsequently killed, caught between the Viet Minh and the French effort at colonial reconquest.

In Sri Lanka, a group of Trotskyists (known as the "T Group"), including South Asia's pioneer Trotskyist, Philip Gunawardena, who had been active in Trotskyist politics in Europe, and his colleague N. M. Perera, were instrumental in the foundation of the Lanka Sama Samaja Party (LSSP) in 1935. It expelled its pro-Moscow wing in 1940, becoming a Trotskyist-led party. In 1942, following the escape of the leaders of the LSSP from a British prison, a unified Bolshevik–Leninist Party of India, Ceylon and Burma (BLPI) was established in India, bringing together the many Trotskyist groups in the subcontinent. The BLPI was active in the Quit India Movement and the labour movement, capturing the second oldest union in India. Its high point was when it led the strikes which followed the Bombay Mutiny.

After the war, the Sri Lanka section split into the Lanka Sama Samaja Party and the Bolshevik Samasamaja Party (BSP). In the general election of 1947, the LSSP became the main opposition party, winning ten seats, the BSP winning a further 5. It joined the Trotskyist Fourth International after fusion with the BSP in 1950 and led a general strike (Hartal) in 1953.

In 1964, the LSSP joined a coalition government with Sirimavo Bandaranaike, with three members, NM Perera, Cholomondeley Goonewardene, and Anil Moonesinghe, brought into the new cabinet. This led to the expulsion of the party from the Fourth International. A section of the LSSP split to form the LSSP (Revolutionary) and joined the Fourth International after the LSSP proper was expelled. The LSSP (Revolutionary) later split into factions led by Bala Tampoe and Edmund Samarakkody. Another faction, the "Sakthi" Group, led by V. Karalasingham, rejoined the LSSP in 1966.

In 1968, another faction of the LSSP (Revolutionary), led by Keerthi Balasooriya split, to form the Revolutionary Socialist League – more commonly known as the "Kamkaru Mawatha Group", after the name of their publication – and joined the International Committee of the Fourth International (ICFI). In 1987, the group changed its name to Socialist Equality Party.

In 1974, a secret faction of the LSSP, allied to the Militant group in the United Kingdom, emerged. In 1977, this faction was expelled and formed the Nava Sama Samaja Party, led by Vasudeva Nanayakkara.

In India, the BLPI fractured. In 1948, at the Fourth International's request, the party's rump dissolved into the Congress Socialist Party as an exercise in entryism.

Europe 

The French section of the Fourth International was the Internationalist Communist Party (PCI). In 1952 the party split when the Fourth International removed its Central Committee and split again when in 1953, the Fourth International itself divided. Further divisions occurred over which independence faction to support in the Algerian War.

In 1967, the rump of the PCI renamed itself the "Internationalist Communist Organisation" (OCI). Members temporarily reconstituted the group as the Trotskyist Organisation but soon obtained a state order permitting the reformation of the OCI. By 1970, the OCI was able to organise a 10,000-strong youth rally. The group also gained a strong base in trade unions. However, further splits and disintegration followed.

In 2016 Jean-Luc Mélenchon, formerly of the ICO, launched the left-wing political platform  (Unbowed France), subsequently endorsed by several parties, including his own Left Party and the French Communist Party. In the 2017 French Presidential Election, he received 19% in the first round. In the same election, Philippe Poutou of the New Anticapitalist Party, into which the Revolutionary Communist League dissolved itself in 2008, won 1.20% of the vote. The only openly Trotskyist candidate, Nathalie Arthaud of Workers' Struggle, won 0.64% of the vote.

In Britain during the 1980s, the entryist Militant group operated within the Labour Party with three members of parliament and effective control of Liverpool City Council. Described by journalist Michael Crick as "Britain's fifth most important political party" in 1986, it played a prominent role in the 1989–1991 anti-poll tax movement, which was widely thought to have led to the downfall of British Prime Minister Margaret Thatcher.

The most enduring of several Trotskyist parties in Britain has been the Socialist Workers Party, formerly the International Socialists (IS). Its founder Tony Cliff rejected the orthodox Trotskyist view of the USSR as a "deformed worker's state." Communist-party regimes were "state capitalist." The SWP has founded several front organisations through which they have sought to exert influence over the broader left, such as the Anti-Nazi League in the late 1970s and the Stop the War Coalition in 2001. It also allied with George Galloway and Respect, whose dissolution in 2007 caused an internal crisis in the SWP. A more serious internal crisis, leading to a significant decline in the party's membership, emerged in 2013. Allegations of rape and sexual assault made against a leading party member developed into a dispute over the practice of democratic centralism (defended by the party's international secretary Alex Callinicos).

In April 2019, a rival splinter from IS made headlines when three former members of the Revolutionary Communist Party campaigned in the European Parliamentary election as candidates for the Brexit Party, and a fourth, Munira Mirza, was appointed head of the Number 10 Downing Street policy unit by the new Conservative Prime Minister Boris Johnson. The RCP's rejection of the SWP's critical engagement with the Labour Party and trade unions had morphed into embracing right-wing libertarian positions.

The Socialist Party in Ireland was formed in 1990 by members who had been expelled by the Irish Labour Party's leader Dick Spring. It has had support in the Fingal electoral district and the city of Limerick. In 2018, it had three elected officials in Dáil Éireann. Paul Murphy representing Dublin West (Dáil constituency), 
Mick Barry representing Cork North-Central (Dáil constituency), and Ruth Coppinger representing Dublin West (Dáil constituency).

In Portugal's October 2015 parliamentary election, the Left Bloc won 550,945 votes, translating into 10.19% of the expressed votes and 19 (out of 230) deputados (members of parliament). Although founded by several leftist tendencies, it still expresses much of the Trotskyist thought upheld and developed by its former leader, Francisco Louçã.

In Turkey, there are some Trotskyist organizations, including the International Socialist Tendency's section (Revolutionary Workers' Socialist Party), Coordinating Committee for the Refoundation of the Fourth International's section (Revolutionary Workers' Party), Permanent Revolution Movement (SDH), Socialism Magazine (sympathizers of the International Committee of the Fourth International), and several small groups.

International 

The Fourth International derives from the 1963 reunification of the two public factions into which the Fourth International split in 1953: the International Secretariat of the Fourth International (ISFI) and some sections of the International Committee of the Fourth International (ICFI). It is often referred to as the United Secretariat of the Fourth International, the name of its leading committee before 2003. The USFI retains sections and sympathizing organizations in over 50 countries, including France's Ligue Communiste Revolutionnaire (LCR) and sections in Portugal, Sri Lanka, the Philippines, and Pakistan.

The International Committee of the Fourth International maintains its independent organization and publishes the World Socialist Web Site.

The Committee for a Workers' International (CWI) was founded in 1974 and has sections in over 35 countries. Before 1997, most organisations affiliated with the CWI sought to build an entrist Marxist wing within the large social democratic parties. The CWI has adopted a range of tactics, including working with trade unions, but in some cases working within or supporting other parties, endorsing Bernie Sanders for the 2016 U.S. Democratic Party nomination and encouraging him to run independently.

It focuses its activities, whether propaganda or intervention, on the industrial proletariat.

The Committee for a Marxist International (CMI) founders claim they were expelled from the CWI when the CWI abandoned entryism. The CWI claims they left, and no expulsions were carried out. Since 2006, it has been known as the International Marxist Tendency (IMT). CMI/IMT groups continue the policy of entering mainstream social democratic, communist or radical parties. Currently, International Marxist Tendency (IMT) is headed by Alan Woods.

The list of Trotskyist internationals shows that there are a large number of other multinational tendencies that stand in the tradition of Leon Trotsky.

Criticism 
Trotskyism has been criticised from various directions. In 1935, Marxist–Leninist Moissaye J. Olgin argued that Trotskyism was "the enemy of the working class" and "should be shunned by anybody who has sympathy for the revolutionary movement of the exploited and oppressed the world over." The African American Marxist–Leninist Harry Haywood, who spent much time in the Soviet Union during the 1920s and 1930s, stated that although he had been somewhat interested in Trotsky's ideas when he was young, he came to see it as "a disruptive force on the fringes of the international revolutionary movement" which eventually developed into "a counter-revolutionary conspiracy against the Party and the Soviet state". He continued to put forward his following belief:
Trotsky was not defeated by bureaucratic decisions or Stalin's control of the Party apparatus—as his partisans and Trotskyite historians claim. He had his day in court and finally lost because his whole position flew in the face of Soviet and world realities. He was doomed to defeat because his ideas were incorrect and failed to conform to objective conditions, as well as the needs and interests of the Soviet people.

Other figures associated with Marxism–Leninism criticized Trotskyist political theory, including Régis Debray and Earl Browder.

Polish philosopher Leszek Kołakowski wrote: "Both Trotsky and Bukharin were emphatic in their assurances that forced labour was an organic part of the new society."

Some left communists, such as Paul Mattick, claim that the October Revolution was totalitarian from the start and, therefore, Trotskyism has no fundamental differences from Stalinism in practice or theory.

In the United States, Dwight Macdonald broke with Trotsky and left the Trotskyist Socialist Workers Party by raising the question of the Kronstadt rebellion, which Trotsky, as leader of the Soviet Red Army, and the other Bolsheviks had brutally repressed. He then moved towards democratic socialism and anarchism. The Lithuanian-American anarchist Emma Goldman raised a similar critique of Trotsky's role in the events around the Kronstadt rebellion. In her essay "Trotsky Protests Too Much", she says: "I admit, the dictatorship under Stalin's rule has become monstrous. That does not, however, lessen the guilt of Leon Trotsky as one of the actors in the revolutionary drama of which Kronstadt was one of the bloodiest scenes". Trotsky defended the actions of the Red Army in his essay "Hue and Cry over Kronstadt".

See also 
 Anti-Stalinist Left
 Democratic communism
 Far-left politics in the United Kingdom
 Fourth International
 Fifth International
 Neo-Stalinism
 Orthodox Trotskyism
 Third Camp
 Trotskyism in Vietnam

Notes

References

Further reading 
 Callinicos, Alex. Trotskyism (Concepts in Social Thought) University of Minnesota Press, 1990.
 Fields, Belden. Trotskyism and Maoism: Theory and Practice in France and the United States Praeger Publishers, 1989.
 Deutscher, Isaac. Stalin: a Political Biography, 1949.
 Marot, John. "Assessing Trotsky", Jacobin, 7 November 2010. 
 North, David In Defense of Leon Trotsky, Mehring Books, 2010.
 Rosmer, Alfred. Trotsky and the Origins of Trotskyism. Republished by Francis Boutle Publishers, now out of print.
 Slaughter, Cliff. Trotskyism Versus Revisionism: A Documentary History (multivolume work, now out of print).

External links 

 Encyclopedia of Trotskyism On-Line
 The Leon Trotsky Internet archive
 The Lubitz TrotskyanaNet
 Trotskyist archives in the United Kingdom

 
Anti-Stalinist left
Eponymous political ideologies
Leninism
Marxist schools of thought
Types of socialism